Michelle de Paula Firmo Reinaldo Bolsonaro (born 22 March 1982) is a former First Lady of Brazil from 2019 to 2022, being the third wife of the 38th President of Brazil, Jair Bolsonaro. She succeeded Marcela Temer, wife of former president Michel Temer, and was succeeded by Rosângela Lula da Silva, wife of current President Luiz Inácio Lula da Silva.

Biography

Family and education
Born and raised in Ceilândia, administrative region of the Federal District, Michelle de Paula is daughter of Maria das Graças  Pereira de Paula Reinaldo and Vicente de Castro Reinaldo. Her father, born in Crateús, Ceará, is a retired bus driver, whose nickname, "Paulo Negão", became nationally known in Jair Bolsonaro speeches to defend himself from accusations of racism. She has a younger stepbrother, Diego de Paula Reinaldo (b. 1988), who is a member of the Brazilian Air Force. Michelle's father and stepmother Maísa are owners of an event confection and production small business.

She has a high school diploma attained through adult education. She enrolled in university as a pharmacy student, but never took classes. She worked as a salesperson in a clothing store and as a supermarket cashier before working as parliamentary secretary.

Chamber and relationship with Bolsonaro
Michelle de Paula Firmo Reinaldo worked as an employee of the Chamber of Deputies between 2006 and 2008. She began at the parliamentary office of Deputy Vanderlei Assis (PP-SP), whose term was recommended to be annulled by the Parliamentary Commission of Inquiry for the "Escândalo dos sanguessugas" in August 2006 Later, he became secretary of Deputy Marco Aurélio Ubiali (PSB-SP). In June 2007, Michelle was nominated for the same position in the leadership of the Progressive Party (PP), remaining until September.

During this period, she had her first contact with her future husband, then federal deputy for the progressives. On September 18, 2007, Michelle became Parliamentary Secretary of Bolsonaro. Just 9 days later, they signed a prenuptial agreement at the 1st Public Registry of Brasilia. After about 6 months of relationship they registered their civil union on November 28, 2007. In 2008, he was dismissed from the position of Parliamentary Secretary after the STF (Supreme Federal Court) understood that the 1988 Constitution prohibited nepotism in Public Administration.

Questions have been raised about checks deposited into Michelle's bank account by Fabricio Queiroz who has been arrested for allegedly defrauding the government.

Personal life
Michelle, who prefers to be called by her composite name, Michelle de Paula, has two daughters: Letícia Aguiar, from a previous relationship, and Laura, from her marriage with Jair Bolsonaro.

In 2010, Michelle gave birth to the couple's daughter, Laura. Her wedding with Bolsonaro, which happened on November 28, 2007, occurred in a party house in Alto da Boa Vista, Rio de Janeiro. At the request of the bride herself, the 150 guest-ceremony was conducted by pastor Silas Malafaia, one of the leaders of the Assembly of God Victory in Christ (Advec), which Bolsonaro was an active member and attendant of until 2016.

The Bolsonaro family lives in a gated community house in Barra da Tijuca, in Rio de Janeiro. In this neighborhood, Bolsonaro has been attending and helping Attitude Baptist Church since she left Advec in 2016, after a temporary misunderstanding between Malafaia and Jair Bolsonaro in the electoral campaign. Despite being a Catholic, Bolsonaro attended the same church with his wife.

On 30 July 2020, Michelle Bolsonaro tested positive for COVID-19, days after her husband said he had recovered from the disease.

Bolsonaro's presidential campaign

During most part of the Bolsonaro's electoral campaign, Bolsonaro didn't get involved herself actively in rallies supporting her husband candidacy, keeping herself discreet and reserved to the media coverage, but following her husband's path in the backstage.

Her first public appearance in an electoral ad happened on 25 October 2018, three days before the second round of the 2018 election between Bolsonaro and Fernando Haddad. In the ad, she praised her husband as a "wonderful human being" and "playful". After the attack against Bolsonaro in Juiz de Fora, on 6 September 2018, Bolsonaro followed her husband during his surgical recovery in Albert Einstein Israeli Hospital, in São Paulo.

Actions as First Lady
After the disclosure of the results of the second round of the presidential election, on the night of 28 October 2018, Jair Bolsonaro finished his victory speech by thanking Michelle Bolsonaro for her support, for having provided "peace, security and strength" for him to reach his objective, pointing out that he couldn't have made it without her. He also offered her a minute to speak, but she refused.

The same night of 28 October, the first interview of Michelle Bolsonaro for RecordTV was broadcast, made exclusively by journalist Eduardo Ribeiro, In it, the new First Lady affirmed she wanted to "make a difference" in favour of the country, that she "will keep doing her job helping disabled people" and demonstrated her will to "do missions in the Northeast sertão".

Bolsonaro has highlighted social causes related to people with disabilities, with visibility for rare diseases, digital inclusion, awareness of autism, inclusion of sign language in schools, and other social projects.

Michelle became the first Brazilian first lady to speak at the Palácio do Planalto parliamentary office during a presidential inauguration in sign language. She is a member of the Ministry of the Deaf of the Baptist Church, where she acted as an interpreter of Brazilian Sign Language in services.

In the traditional statement by the President of the Republic on Christmas Eve, on the night of 24 December 2019, for the first time, a First Lady spoke alongside the President on national radio and television broadcast. Michelle, who wore a red shirt with the name "Jesus", wished a blessed Christmas to all Brazilians and highlighted that "together, with love and dedication, we can build a more just, more inclusive and more supportive Brazil for all".

Political activities 
During the 2022 presidential election, Michelle was noted for her role as a popular surrogate for her husband's campaign. 

In February 2023, it was reported that Liberal Party figures, including party leader Valdemar Costa Neto, indicated support for nominating Michelle in the 2026 election should Jair Bolsonaro decline to run. Michelle stated that she would not run for amid speculation of a possible candidacy.

References

External links

 

1982 births
Living people
People from Federal District (Brazil)
First ladies of Brazil
Michelle
Brazilian Baptists
Spouses of Brazilian politicians